The Frank Howard House is a historic house in Atchison, Kansas. It was built in 1884-1885 for Frank Howard, a dry goods merchant and clothing manufacturer.

The house was designed by H. B. Prudden in the Stick-Eastlake architectural style. It has been listed on the National Register of Historic Places since October 15, 1984.

References

Houses on the National Register of Historic Places in Kansas
National Register of Historic Places in Atchison County, Kansas
Stick-Eastlake architecture in the United States
Houses completed in 1885